Papa is a word used in many languages as an affectionate term for father. 

Papa or PAPA may refer to:

Geography  and  geology
Pápa, a town in Hungary
Papa village (Samoa), on the island of Savai'i
Papa, Scotland, various islands
Papa rock, a Māori-derived term for a blue-grey mudstone common in New Zealand

People
Papa (Latin for Pope), the bishop of Rome and leader of Catholic Church
Papa bar Aggai (3rd century), Bishop of Seleucia-Ctesiphon and a founding figure in the Church of the East
Papa, a monk martyred with Abda and Abdisho
Papa (nickname), a list of people
Papa (surname)

Mythology
Rangi and Papa, the primordial parents according to Māori mythology
Papa (mythology), the earth goddess in Cook Islands mythology
 A category of Karma in Jainism

Arts and entertainment

Papa (TV series), a 1996 South Korean drama series
Papa (2012 Egyptian film), a 2012 Egyptian drama film
Papa (2012 South Korean film), a 2012 South Korean comedy-drama film
Papa: Hemingway in Cuba, a 2015 Canadian-American biographical film about Ernest Hemingway and shot in Cuba
Papa (2016 film), a Chinese comedy-drama film
Papa (2018 film), an American drama film

Music
"Papa" (song), from the BBC drama Gideon's Daughter
"Papa" (Prince song), a 1994 song from Come by Prince
"Pa-Pa", a song from Hell of a Tester by The Rasmus

Acronym
British Amateur Press Association (comics fandom), an amateur press association which first published under the name PAPA
Professional and Amateur Pinball Association
Parallax Aircraft Parking Aid, a device that indicates where pilots should stop in a stand

Other uses
Papa, the letter "P" in the NATO and ICAO phonetic alphabets
Papa-class Soviet submarines, the sole member being Soviet submarine K-222
, the Spanish word for potato, used in the names of numerous Latin American potato-based dishes
Station P, an oceanographic measure station often called Station Papa

See also
 Mama and papa, in linguistics, a commonly seen sequence of sounds meaning "mother" and "father"
 
 
 Papas or Pappas, a common Greek surname
 Pappa, a Roman town, also called Tiberiopolis
 Paw Paw (disambiguation)